Michael Cahill (born June 17, 1952) is a former professional tennis player from the United States.  

Cahill enjoyed most of his tennis success while playing doubles. During his career, he won five doubles titles. He achieved a career-high doubles ranking of world no. 94 in 1983.

Cahill played college tennis at the University of Alabama.

Career finals

Singles (1 runner-up)

Doubles (5 titles, 14 runner-ups)

References

External links
 
 

Alabama Crimson Tide men's tennis players
American male tennis players
People from Washington County, Wisconsin
Sportspeople from Waukesha, Wisconsin
Tennis people from Wisconsin
1952 births
Living people